Tsang Tung Ming (born 21 July 1999) is a Hong Kong professional footballer. He plays as a Midfielder

Career statistics

Club

Notes

References

Living people
1999 births
Hong Kong footballers
Association football midfielders
Hong Kong Premier League players
R&F (Hong Kong) players